Paayum Puli may refer to:
 Paayum Puli (1983 film)
 Paayum Puli (2015 film)

See also 
 Payum Puli, a 2007 film